In Your Dreams (also known as Sommer Deines Lebens) is an Australian children's drama television series that was first screened on the Seven Network's digital channel 7TWO from 22 November 2013 to 27 December 2013. A second season,  known as In Your Dreams 2, was screened from 15 June 2014. The series is a Southern Star Entertainment Production for NDR Germany and the Seven Network Australia.

Synopsis
Australian teenaged twins, Samantha and Benjamin Hazelton, spend the summer with their eccentric, aristocratic relatives, the von Hasenburg family, who live in the remote German Schoneburg Castle. The family fortune has dwindled to almost nothing, so Sam and Ben must help them save the castle and turn their fortunes around before bankruptcy descends and centuries of von Hassenburg entitlement come to an end.

Cast
 Tessa de Josselin as Sam
 David Delmenico as Ben
 Jörn Knebel as Baron Philipp
 Lars Kokemüller as Marcus
 Soma Alusia Pysall as Lili
 Kendra Appleton as Sophie
 Bardiya McKinnon as Jack
 Raechelle Banno
 Mia Morrissey as Lucy
 Patrick Phillips as Rude File Clerk
 Anna-Lena Schwing as Mia
 Sheena Reyes as Constable Marsh

External links

References

7two original programming
Australian children's television series
2013 Australian television series debuts
2013 Australian television series endings
English-language television shows
Television series about siblings
Television series about teenagers
Television series about twins
Television series by Endemol Australia